Kristin Elizabeth Cavallari (born January 5, 1987) is an American television personality, fashion designer, and author. She first rose to fame in 2004 as a cast member on the popular MTV reality television series Laguna Beach: The Real Orange County (2004–2006), then on the spin-off MTV reality television series The Hills (2009–2010), and was later given her own E! reality series to star in, Very Cavallari (2018–2020). She also starred as an actress on television shows and in films, including National Lampoon's Van Wilder: Freshman Year. In 2017, Cavallari founded the company Uncommon James, which sells jewelry, homeware, skincare, and beauty products.

Life and career

Early life
Cavallari was born in Denver, Colorado, one of two children born to Judith Eifrig and Dennis Cavallari, the other being her late older brother, Michael Cavallari. She is of Italian heritage through her father and of German heritage through her mother. After her parents divorced, she moved with her mother from Denver to Barrington, Illinois, a suburb of Chicago, where she lived until her freshman year of high school, when she moved to Laguna Beach, California, to live with her father and brother. She graduated from Laguna Beach High School in 2005. She then briefly attended Loyola Marymount University in Los Angeles but dropped out to pursue her acting career.

Reality television
Cavallari was in her junior year of high school when the first season of Laguna Beach: The Real Orange County began production. At the time, she was involved in an on-and-off relationship with senior Stephen Colletti. Cavallari's romance with Colletti caused a rivalry with another cast member, Lauren Conrad, which was covered in the show. After Laguna Beach, Cavallari moved to Los Angeles and signed on the UPN reality television series Get This Party Started, which premiered in February 2006 and was canceled after airing two episodes. In 2009, Cavallari joined the cast of Laguna Beach'''s spin-off series, The Hills, making her first appearance on the series during the fifth season's midseason finale at Heidi Montag and Spencer Pratt's wedding, where she caught the bouquet. For the second half of the season, Cavallari replaced Conrad as a main cast member and narrator. Despite originally signing a deal with MTV to appear in two additional seasons following the fifth, the sixth and final season concluded in July 2010. Cavallari then appeared on various reality competition shows as a guest, and as a contestant on the 13th season of ABC's Dancing with the Stars, partnering with two-time champion Mark Ballas. She was the third to be eliminated.<ref>{{Cite news|url=http://www.hollywoodreporter.com/live-feed/dancing-with-the-stars-kristin-cavallari-voted-off-244436|title='Dancing With the Stars Kristin Cavallari: Why I Got Voted Off (Video)|work=The Hollywood Reporter|access-date=September 29, 2017|language=en}}</ref> In 2012, Cavallari began commentating the Academy Awards for E! and in 2014, she co-hosted the half-hour fashion and lifestyle trends show The Fabulist. In April 2018, E! announced a reality show starring Cavallari, Very Cavallari, which premiered that July and followed her opening the flagship store for Uncommon James. In May 2020, after three seasons, Cavallari announced that she was ending her series. In 2021, Cavallari made two final guest appearances on the second season of The Hills' sequel, The Hills: New Beginnings. In 2022, Cavallari started a podcast with her former Laguna Beach co-star Stephen Colletti called Back to the Beach with Kristin and Stephen, in collaboration with Dear Media. The podcast revisits the show with behind-the-scenes commentary and special guests.

Acting
Cavallari appeared on one episode of another UPN series, Veronica Mars, and went on to guest roles on series including CSI: NY, The Middle, and Adventures in Hollyhood. In 2006, she signed on as Crystal in the horror film Fingerprints. In 2008, she had a supporting role as Summer in Spring Breakdown, which was released direct-to-DVD. She also starred in the independent film Green Flash with Torrey DeVitto. In 2009, she starred as Trish in the independent American high school comedy film Wild Cherry and as Kaitlyn in the direct-to-DVD film National Lampoon's Van Wilder: Freshman Year. She made acting appearances with Cutler and solo on the American sitcom The League in 2012 and 2013.

Fashion lines
Cavallari served as an ambassador for the children's charity OneKid OneWorld, traveling to El Salvador to rebuild schools in local communities in 2010. After another trip to Kenya the following year, Cavallari made her first foray in fashion design by collaborating with the company ShoeDazzle to design a spring shoe, with proceeds benefiting the charity. In 2012, Cavallari designed the first of many shoe lines for the company Chinese Laundry. She launched her first jewelry collection in 2013, in collaboration with GLAMboutique. In 2014, she co-founded a jewelry line with her friend Chelsea Bulte called Emerald Duv; she left the brand in 2016 to launch her solo line the following year. She founded her jewelry business, Uncommon James, in 2017, which later expanded into selling home and beauty products. She subsequently founded a children's clothing line, Little James, in 2019. In collaboration with Feat Clothing, she launched an athleisure collection in July 2021.

Lifestyle books
Cavallari wrote her first book, the lifestyle-oriented autobiography Balancing in Heels, in 2016. She has also published two cookbooks, True Roots and True Comfort, with recipes without gluten, dairy or refined sugar, in 2018 and 2020, respectively. Both cookbooks were created in collaboration with Chef Mike Kubiesa. All of her books were New York Times bestsellers, and her comfort food cookbook, True Comfort, was named one of the best cookbooks of the year by Delish. Her third cookbook, Truly Simple, is set to be released on April 4, 2023.

Personal life
In June 2013, Cavallari married Chicago Bears quarterback Jay Cutler. They have three children. In March 2014, she drew criticism for refusing to vaccinate her children, a decision she and her husband made due to their concerns over the alleged claims of a connection between childhood vaccination and autism.

On December 10, 2015, her brother Michael was found dead from hypothermia following a car crash.

In June 2018, Cavallari and Cutler put their Nashville, Tennessee mansion up for sale for $7.9 million and sold the estate for $3.7 million in 2020. The couple purchased another mansion in Nashville for $4.2 million in April 2018. In April 2020, Cutler filed for divorce and agreed to share joint custody of the children with Cavallari. Following their divorce announcement, Cavallari purchased a $5.5 million estate in nearby Franklin for herself that same month. As of May 2021, the couple had not finalized their divorce due to financial disputes. In June 2022, it was reported that their settlement had been finalized and the couple was officially divorced.

Filmography

As actress

As herself

Music videos

Published works 
Balancing in Heels: My Journey to Health, Happiness, and Making it all Work (2016)
True Roots: A Mindful Kitchen With More Than 100 Recipes Free Of Gluten, Dairy, And Refined Sugar (2018)
True Comfort: More Than 100 Cozy Recipes Free Of Gluten And Refined Sugar (2020)
Truly Simple: 140 Healthy Recipes for Weekday Cooking (2023)

Awards and nominations

References

External links 

 
 
 Uncommon James business website

1987 births
21st-century American women

Actresses from Denver
Actresses from Chicago
Actresses from Hollywood, Los Angeles
Actresses from Orange County, California
Activists from California
American film actresses
American people of German descent
American people of Italian descent
American television actresses
Gluten-free cookbook writers
HIV/AIDS activists
American LGBT rights activists
Living people
Participants in American reality television series
People from Barrington, Illinois
People from Laguna Beach, California
The Hills (TV series)
Women cookbook writers